Nikolai Kasatkin may refer to:

 Saint Nicholas of Japan, Nikolai Kasatkin (born Ivan Dimitrovich Kasatkin 1836 ; died 1912)
 Russian painter Nikolai Alekseyevich Kasatkin (1859 – 1930)